is a Japanese actor and model. He is represented with Sony Music Artists. He started his career as a model for Men's Non-no. He starred in the drama film Flashback.

Filmography

Film

Anime films

Television

Music video

Bibliography

Magazines

Awards

References

External links
 - 
Men's Non-no profile - 

Japanese male models
1993 births
Living people
Actors from Saitama Prefecture
21st-century Japanese male actors
Models from Saitama Prefecture